"Sure As I'm Sittin' Here" is a song written and originally performed by John Hiatt.  Hiatt released the original version of the song as a single in February, 1974, and included it on his debut album Hangin' Around the Observatory.  Hiatt's version of "Sure As I'm Sittin' Here" failed to chart.

Other Versions
Three Dog Night released the song as a single in mid 1974, where it reached #16 on the Billboard chart and #18 in Canada in 1974.  Three Dog Night's version of "Sure As I'm Sittin' Here" was produced by Jimmy Ienner. It was featured on their 1974 album, Hard Labor.  Though they would make the top 40 in both US and Canada with two further singles, this was Three Dog Night's final top 20 hit.

References

1974 songs
1974 singles
Songs written by John Hiatt
John Hiatt songs
Three Dog Night songs
Dunhill Records singles